In Greek mythology, Eurycyda (Ancient Greek: Εὐρυκύδα, sic) was an Elean princess as the daughter of King Endymion of Elis by either Asterodia, Chromia or Hyperippe. Her brothers were Aetolus, Epeius, Paeon and possibly Naxos.

With Poseidon, she mothered Eleius, after whom the region of Elis was named, as was its people, the Eleans. Several authors refer to her as "Eurypyle".

Notes

References 

 Conon, Fifty Narrations, surviving as one-paragraph summaries in the Bibliotheca (Library) of Photius, Patriarch of Constantinople translated from the Greek by Brady Kiesling. Online version at the Topos Text Project.
 Pausanias, Description of Greece with an English Translation by W.H.S. Jones, Litt.D., and H.A. Ormerod, M.A., in 4 Volumes. Cambridge, MA, Harvard University Press; London, William Heinemann Ltd. 1918. . Online version at the Perseus Digital Library
 Pausanias, Graeciae Descriptio. 3 vols. Leipzig, Teubner. 1903.  Greek text available at the Perseus Digital Library.
Stephanus of Byzantium, Stephani Byzantii Ethnicorum quae supersunt, edited by August Meineike (1790-1870), published 1849. A few entries from this important ancient handbook of place names have been translated by Brady Kiesling. Online version at the Topos Text Project.

Women of Poseidon
Family of Calyce
Elean mythology